Holberrow Green is a village in Worcestershire, England.

External links

Villages in Worcestershire